Wahed is an American financial technology and services company based in New York City, New York. In July 2019, the company launched the first exchange-traded fund in the United States that was compliant with Sharia law. Wahed operates in 130 countries and has offices in Washington D.C, New York, London and Dubai. According to Bloomberg, it has a valuation of $300 million.

History
The idea for Wahed Invest came about in 2015, after founder Junaid Wahedna was shocked to find his New York taxi driver was seeking financial advice from an imam as opposed to qualified financial advisor. This conversation inspired Wahedna to launch Wahed Invest.

In 2017, Wahed Invest launched the world's first automated Islamic investment platform. 

In November 2017, Wahed raised seed capital from investors including former JPMorgan Chase managing director John Elkhair and director of McKinsey & Company, Laurent Nordin.

In August 2018, Wahed made its first international expansion by launching its operations in the UK. In October 2018, Wahed raised a $7 million round with Cue Ball Capital and BECO Capital. In November 2018, the company launched a Halal Stock Screener mobile app to compare 50,000 Sharia-compliant stocks.

In July 2019, the company launched the Wahed FTSE USA Shariah ETF (HLAL), which tracks a benchmark derived from the broad FTSE USA Index.

In July 2020, Wahed raised $25 million in a Series A funding round led by Saudi Aramco Entrepreneurship Ventures with participation from existing investors BECO and Cue Ball Capital, as well as Dubai Cultiv8 and Rasameel.  In December 2020 Wahed acquired Niyah Ltd, a British company that runs a digital banking app designed for the Muslim community for an undisclosed amount. 

In 2021, Khabib Nurmagomedov joined as an investor and brand ambassador, and, in 2022, Paul Pogba also joined these roles. On 10 February 2022, the U.S. Securities and Exchange Commission charged Wahed Invest, LLC with making misleading statements and for compliance failures related to its Shari’ah advisory business. Wahed Invest consented to the entry of the SEC’s order and agreed, via a cease-and-desist order, to pay a $300,000 penalty as well as retain an independent compliance consultant among other undertakings. In June 2022, Wahed completed a $50 million Series B funding round, putting the company's valuation at $300 million.

Company 
Wahed is aimed at investors looking for ethical investments aligned with Islamic principles. Wahed is regulated in the following jurisdictions: SEC (USA), FCA (UK), SEBI (India), OJK (Indonesia), AFSA (Kazakhstan), SC (Malaysia), FSC (Mauritius) and FSCA (South Africa). An ethical review board monitors the company's investments to make sure they agree with Islamic values. The investment company cannot involve liquor, firearms, gambling or tobacco industries, nor can they generate excess profit from charging interest. The robo-advisor invests in Sukuks (Islamic bonds), U.S. stocks, emerging stock markets, real estate and gold.

References

External links
 SEC order

Financial services companies established in 2015
Investment promotion agencies
2015 establishments in New York City
Financial advisors
Financial services companies based in New York City